Chavaughn Camarley Walsh (born 29 December 1987) is an Antigua and Barbuda sprinter. He competed in the 4 × 100 metres relay event at the 2015 World Championships in Beijing finishing sixth in the final.

International competitions

1Disqualified in the final

Personal bests
Outdoor
100 metres – 10.22 (+1.8 m/s, San Marcos 2015)
200 metres – 20.85 (-0.1 m/s, Houston 2015)
Indoor
60 metres – 6.59 (Houston 2016)
200 metres – 21.05 (College Station 2015)

References

External links

1987 births
Living people
Antigua and Barbuda male sprinters
Athletes (track and field) at the 2014 Commonwealth Games
Athletes (track and field) at the 2015 Pan American Games
Commonwealth Games competitors for Antigua and Barbuda
Pan American Games competitors for Antigua and Barbuda
World Athletics Championships athletes for Antigua and Barbuda
People from St. John's, Antigua and Barbuda
Olympic athletes of Antigua and Barbuda
Athletes (track and field) at the 2016 Summer Olympics